Saginafusus is a genus of sea snails, marine gastropod mollusks in the family Fasciolariidae, the spindle snails, the tulip snails and their allies.

Species
Species within the genus Saginafusus include:

 Saginafusus pricei (E.A. Smith, 1887)

References

External links

Fasciolariidae
Monotypic gastropod genera